Let Love In is the eighth studio album by American rock band the Goo Goo Dolls, released in 2006. The album peaked at #9 on the US Billboard 200, selling around 83,000 copies in its first week. The album was certified Gold for sales of 500,000
units in May 2019 by the Recording Industry Association of America.

Track listing 
All songs written by Johnny Rzeznik except when noted.

Tour Edition DVD
Live and Intimate
 "Stay with You"
 "Let Love In"
 "Feel the Silence"
 "Better Days"
 "Without You Here"
 "Listen"
 "Can't Let It Go"
 "We'll Be Here (When You're Gone)
 "Strange Love"
 "Black Balloon"
 "Iris"
 "Become"
 "Broadway"
 "Here Is Gone"

Audio studio tracks
 "We'll Be Here (When You're Gone) (Acoustic)
 "Better Days" (Acoustic) (also included on Japan pressings)

Personnel 
 John Rzeznik – lead guitar, lead and backing vocals
 Robby Takac – bass, backing vocals, lead vocals on "Listen" and "Strange Love"
 Mike Malinin – drums, percussion

Additional personnel

 Joel Shearer – rhythm guitars
 Zac Rae – keyboards
 Tim Pierce – rhythm guitars
 Greg Suran – rhythm guitars
 Paul Gordon – keyboards
 Brian Kilgore – percussion

Production notes 
 Mixed by Jack Joseph Puig
 Mastered by Ted Jensen

Charts

Certifications

References

External links 
 
 

2006 albums
Goo Goo Dolls albums
Albums produced by Glen Ballard
Albums produced by Rob Cavallo
Warner Records albums